Tomati may refer to:

 Giovanni Dominico Tomati (1636-1711), Roman Catholic prelate who served as Titular Bishop of Cyrene
 Marco Antonio Tomati (bishop of Asti) (1593-1683), Roman Catholic prelate who served as Bishop of Asti
 Marco Antonio Tomati (bishop of Bitetto) (1591-1665), a Roman Catholic prelate who served as Bishop of Bitetto

See also 

 Tomatis, a surname
 Tomato (disambiguation)